Bernhard Hendl (born 9 August 1992) is an Austrian football goalkeeper who plays for First Vienna FC. He made his professional debut for SSV Jahn Regensburg on 26 October 2013 in a 3. Liga match against FC Rot-Weiß Erfurt.

References

External links
 

1992 births
Living people
Austrian footballers
SSV Jahn Regensburg players
1. FSV Mainz 05 II players
Berliner FC Dynamo players
First Vienna FC players
3. Liga players
Association football goalkeepers